The 2005–06 Swiss Challenge League was the third season of the Swiss Challenge League, the second tier of the Swiss football league pyramid. It began on 15 July 2005 and ended on 13 May 2006. The champions of this season, FC Luzern, earned promotion to the 2006–07 Super League. The runners-up FC Sion won the promotion/relegation playoff against the 9th-placed team of the 2005–06 Super League, Neuchâtel Xamax. The bottom tho teams, FC Baden and FC Meyrin, were relegated to the 1. Liga.

Clubs

FC Baden
FC Baulmes
AC Bellinzona
FC Chiasso
FC Concordia Basel
SC YF Juventus
SC Kriens
FC La Chaux-de-Fonds
FC Lausanne-Sport
FC Locarno
FC Luzern
AC Lugano
FC Meyrin
FC Sion
FC Vaduz
FC Wil
FC Winterthur
FC Wohlen

League table

Promotion/relegation playoff

FC Sion promoted to the Swiss Super League.

Results

External links
RSSSF

Swiss Challenge League seasons
Swiss
2005–06 in Swiss football